This is My God is a non-fiction book by Herman Wouk, first published in 1959. The book summarizes many key aspects of Judaism and is intended for both Jewish and non-Jewish audiences. The author, who served in the United States Navy and was a Pulitzer Prize–winning novelist, writes from a Modern Orthodox perspective.

Key topics
Jewish history
Shabbat
High Holy Days
Minor Holy Days (9th of Av, Purim, Hanukkah)
 Jewish prayer
Kashrut (dietary laws)
Torah
Talmud
Orthodox Judaism
Reform Judaism
Israel
Zionism. This is My God, page 264, first edition (1959), published by Doubleday, Garden City.

References

Additional source
This is my God (1988) by Herman Wouk.  (This edition is published by Little, Brown, and Company.)

1959 non-fiction books
Books about Judaism
Modern Orthodox Judaism
Doubleday (publisher) books
Works by Herman Wouk